Gravitcornutia sodalicia is a species of moth of the family Tortricidae. It is found in Bahia, Brazil.

The wingspan is 14 mm. The ground colour of the forewings is cream, in the basal third slightly mixed with ochreous. The dots are ochreous, but grey brown at the costa. The markings are grey with black edges. The hindwings are grey, but more cream basally.

Etymology
The species name refers to the similarly coloured group of species to which it belongs and is derived from Latin sodalis (meaning a companion).

References

Moths described in 2010
Gravitcornutia
Moths of South America
Taxa named by Józef Razowski